Pristimantis turumiquirensis is a species of frog in the family Strabomantidae.
It is endemic to Venezuela.
Its natural habitats are tropical moist montane forests and caves.
It is threatened by habitat loss.

References

turumiquirensis
Endemic fauna of Venezuela
Amphibians of Venezuela
Amphibians described in 1961
Taxonomy articles created by Polbot